Des Dearlove (born 1963) is a British business journalist and management theorist, known for his work on the history and state-of-the-art of management theory. 

An internationally recognized expert and commentator on management thinking, for over two decades Dearlove has championed the leading management ideas through Thinkers50, the first global ranking of management thinkers, which he co-founded in 2001 with Stuart Crainer. 

Thinkers50 is a mission-drive organization which aims to be the world’s most reliable resource for identifying, ranking, and sharing the leading management and business ideas of our age: ideas that can make a real difference in the world. 

Dearlove is a former columnist to The (London) Times, and contributing editor to Strategy+Business. He was the co-editor (with Stuart Crainer) of the Financial Times Handbook of Management. 

Dearlove and Crainer are the authors of a number of books, including Generation Entrepreneur (FT.com); Gravy Training: Inside the Business of Business Schools (Jossey-Bass), and The Ultimate Book of Business Thinking (Capstone).

Dearlove has taught at leading business schools, including IE Business School, and the Said Business School at Oxford University, where he is an associate fellow. He is an adjunct professor at IE Business School.

Under the pen name of D.D. Everest, Dearlove is also the author of the Archie Greene trilogy of children’s books (Faber & Faber). In 2014, Archie Greene and the Magician’s Secret was shortlisted for the National Book Awards.

Selected publications 
 Actions Speak Louder (with David Clutterbuck and Deborah Snow), Kogan Page, 1992
 Key Management Decisions, FT Pitman, 1998
 The Interim Manager (with David Clutterbuck), FT Pitman, 1999
 The Ultimate Business Guru Book, (with Stuart Crainer) Capstone, 1997
 Gravy Training: Inside the Business of Business School, (with Stuart Crainer) Jossey Bass, 1999
 The Ultimate Book of Business Brands, (with Stuart Crainer) Capstone, 1999
 MBA Planet (with Stuart Crainer), Financial Times Prentice Hall, 2000
 The Financial Times Handbook of Management (ed. second edition), FT Pitman, 2000
 Generation Entrepreneur (with Stuart Crainer), FT.com, 2000
 Business Minds (with Tom Brown, Stuart Crainer and Jorge Nascimento Rodrigues), FT Prentice Hall, 2001
 Firestarters! (with Stuart Crainer), Financial Times Prentice Hall, 2001
 The Financial Times Guide to Business Travel, (edited with Stuart Crainer), 2001
 The Career Adventurer’s Fieldbook (with Steve Coomber and Stuart Crainer), Capstone, 2002
 The Ultimate Book of Business Thinking, Capstone, 2003
 Business, the Universe and Everything (with Stuart Crainer), Capstone, 2003
 The Financial Times Handbook of Management (ed. with Stuart Crainer, third edition), Financial Times Prentice Hall, 2004
 The Business World Atlas (with Stuart Crainer), Meteor Press, 2006
 Archie Greene and the Magician’s Secret, (under the pen name of D.D Everest) Faber & Faber, 2014
 Archie Greene and the Alchemist’s Curse, (under the pen name of D.D Everest) Faber & Faber, 2016
 Archie Greene and the Raven’s Spell, (under the pen name of D.D Everest) Faber & Faber, 2017
 Dear CEO (with Stuart Crainer, editors), Bloomsbury, 2017

References

External links 
 Des Dearlove & Stuart Crainer, co-founders of Thinkers50

1960s births
Living people
British male journalists
British business theorists
Alumni of the University of Southampton
Place of birth missing (living people)